Tamarugite (NaAl(SO4)2·6H2O) is a colorless monoclinic sulfate mineral.

Deposits containing tamarugite are geographically dispersed with occurrences of the mineral on all seven continents (Antarctica, Oceania, North America, South America, Europe, Asia, Africa). also in the Ghoroghchi area in Iran.  The mineral's name comes from the Tamarugal Pampa locality in Chile. It is also known as lapparentite.

See also
List of minerals

References

 Handbook of Mineralogy

Bibliography
Palache, P.; Berman H.; Frondel, C. (1960). "Dana's System of Mineralogy, Volume II: Halides, Nitrates, Borates, Carbonates, Sulfates, Phosphates, Arsenates, Tungstates, Molybdates, Etc. (Seventh Edition)" John Wiley and Sons, Inc., New York, pp. 466–468.

Sodium minerals
Aluminium minerals
Sulfate minerals
Monoclinic minerals
Minerals in space group 14